Zippy is a fictional character on the British children's television programme Rainbow. Zippy is a light-orange ("tangerine") puppet of ambiguous species with a rugby-ball-shaped oval head, blue eyes and a zip for a mouth, hence his name. His voice was first provided by Peter Hawkins in 1972.  Hawkins was replaced by Roy Skelton in 1973,  who continued to voice Zippy for the best part of thirty years and also provided the voice of George, the pink hippo. Violet Philpott was first to operate the character in 1972 before John Thirtle took over in 1973 and then Ronnie Le Drew in 1974, the latter still operating and providing his voice until present day.

It is unclear what kind of creature the character represents; while Bungle is a bear and George a hippopotamus, Zippy bears no obvious resemblance to any real animal. Presenter Geoffrey Hayes has said of him, "I don't think anyone has a clue what he's meant to be, and his output as a journalist is shocking".

Personality

The character is the best known character from the show. Zippy claims to be the best at whatever is being discussed, and always claims to be right. He loves to eat sweets, sing songs and tell his favourite jokes, and always has to be the centre of attention. For example, the other characters might be having a discussion, when Zippy would shout: "But I don't want to talk, I want to sing!  I'm very good at singing!  [starts singing] I'm a little teapot short and stout, here's my handle and here's my spout..."

Due to his frequently loud behaviour and silly voice getting him into all sorts of trouble, other characters in Rainbow occasionally zip his mouth shut for a short time, rendering him unable to talk. On at least one occasion he unzips himself, although he appears unable to do so on most occasions. Zippy is well known for his love of food, and in many episodes is seen eating.

Appearance
In a The Sun tabloid newspaper article headlined "Revealed: Why lost star Zippy is orange", Zippy's orange colour is apparently due to presenter Geoffrey Hayes following Dundee United F.C. when living in Dundee, Scotland, during the 1960s and 1970s. The show's producers were set to make Zippy blue – the colour of neighbouring rivals Dundee F.C. – but Geoffrey convinced them otherwise.

However, Zippy had been orange from the earliest episodes in 1972, over a year before Hayes joined the series.

When asked to reveal what he is in interviews, he claims he is a 'Unique.'

In a BBC online poll from March 2006, Zippy was named as Britain's favourite sporting celebrity fan by a landslide margin with 47% of the vote. Described as Dundee United's biggest fan, several newspapers including the Daily Record, The Courier and Sunday Herald also covered the story in print and online. The poll included lifelong Port Vale F.C. fan Robbie Williams and Delia Smith, a director at Norwich City F.C. In second place with 9.74% was movie star and Sheffield United F.C. fan Sean Bean. The poll attracted more than 15,000 votes.

Later appearances
In 2001, Zippy turned down the role of Alonso Harris in Training Day, stating that the character was not "street enough".  It is rumoured that Zippy's rivalry with Snoop Dogg played a large part in the decision.

In 2002, Zippy appeared in the "My Mate / I hate" advertising campaign for Marmite in the UK.  In the TV commercial he zipped up his own mouth when confronted with Marmite, thus confirming his hate for the product.

Roy Skelton would reprise his role many times from 2002 to 2009: the I Love Muppets documentary, Ant and Dec's Gameshow Marathon, an episode of Favouritism entitled "Zippy and George's Puppet Legends", The Weakest Link, Ashes to Ashes, TV Burp and The Official BBC Children in Need Medley before Ronnie Le Drew took over starting with Zippy and George's appearance on The One Show. Since then Zippy has appeared on Celebrity Juice, Children in Needs 2016 and 2021, a Pizza Hut delivery advert, The Last Leg 2017 and 2021 and The Big Breakfast.

Further reading
 Climbing High: Life Under the Rainbow Exposed by V. S. Ganjabhang and Mike Anderiesz, Pan MacMillan (2002)
 The A-Z of Classic Children's Television by Simon Sheridan, Reynolds & Hearn (2007)
 Rainbow Unzipped: The Shocking Truth about Zippy, George and Bungle - In Their Own Words by Tim Randall, Headline (2009)
 Zippy and Me: My Life Inside Britain’s Most Infamous Puppet by Ronnie LeDrew, Unbound (2019)

References

External links
A Zippy fanpage with sound files

Television characters introduced in 1972
Rainbow (TV series) characters
British comedy puppets
Male characters in television